M. silvestrii may refer to:
 Megalomyrmex silvestrii, Wheeler, 1909, an ant species in the genus Megalomyrmex
 Mosfora silvestrii, Roewer, 1925, a harvestman species in the genus Mosfora and the family Epedanidae found in Funkiko
 Myrmica silvestrii, Wheeler, an ant species in the genus Myrmica

See also
 Silvestrii (disambiguation)